Belleville is a former commune of the Rhône department in eastern France. On 1 January 2019, it was merged into the new commune Belleville-en-Beaujolais.

See also
Communes of the Rhône department

References

External links
 Belleville at Quid

Former communes of Rhône (department)
Beaujolais (province)